Griselda María de los Ángeles González Santillo (born December 4, 1965 in Buenos Aires) is a retired female long-distance runner from Argentina. She twice won the Buenos Aires Marathon in her native country. She also represented Argentine twice (1992 and 1996) at the Summer Olympics, before switching nationality and competing for Spain.

González had success at the South American Cross Country Championships where she took silver in the 1987 and 1988 races before finally taking the gold in 1989.

Achievements

References

External links

1965 births
Living people
Argentine female marathon runners
Argentine emigrants to Spain
Spanish female marathon runners
Argentine female long-distance runners
Spanish female long-distance runners
Athletes (track and field) at the 1992 Summer Olympics
Athletes (track and field) at the 1996 Summer Olympics
Athletes (track and field) at the 2000 Summer Olympics
Olympic athletes of Argentina
Olympic athletes of Spain
Athletes from Buenos Aires
Athletes (track and field) at the 1991 Pan American Games
Pan American Games competitors for Argentina
World Athletics Championships athletes for Spain
World Athletics Championships athletes for Argentina